Rederchius was a legendary king of the Britons according to Geoffrey of Monmouth's History of the Kings of Britain (1136). He was preceded by Redon and succeeded by Samuil Penissel.

References

Legendary British kings